Lasa eta Zabala is a 2014 Spanish film directed by Pablo Malo regarding the killing of Lasa and Zabala.

Plot 
The film depicts the kidnapping, torture and murder of Lasa and Zabala.

External links 
 

2014 films
Spanish drama films
Spanish films based on actual events
Films about ETA (separatist group)
Torture in films
2010s Spanish films